Mirza Sarajlija (born June 19, 1991) is a Slovenian professional basketball player who last played for Fjölnir of the Úrvalsdeild karla.

Professional career
Sarajlija began his career with Union Olimpija as a junior. He made his senior team debut in the 2007–08 season, winning the Slovenian national league and cup that year.

Sarajlija made his Euroleague debut on November 27, 2008, versus Alba Berlin, scoring 13 points and 3 rebounds with only 17 years. He averaged 6.5 points, 1.7 rebounds and 1.2 assists per game in his first season of Euroleague play.

In July 2009, Sarajlija left Olimpija and moved to Krka. However, he did not pass the medical tests for the club and was released.

In September 2009, Sarajlija signed a three-year contract with Bosna. He played there only one season before moving to Mornar from Montenegro.

On November 7, 2012, Sarajlija returned to his homeland and signed with LTH Castings Mercator. In February 2013, he signed with Tamiš from Serbia. He joined KK Šentjur for the 2016–17 season.

In October 2017, he signed with KK Jazine of the Croatian League.

On December 19, 2018, he signed with KK Rogaška.

Season 2019-20 he started in Russian Super League 1 for Temp-SUMZ-UGMK Revda, but left team in December 2019. In 10 games he averaged 9.3ppg, 3.5rpg and 3.6apg.
On January 18, 2020, Sarajlija joined Greek 2nd division Koroivos.

In June 2020, Sarajlija signed with Úrvalsdeild karla club Stjarnan. During the regular season, he averaged 14.2 points, 3.4 assists and 4.1 rebounds per game whil shooting 36.4% from the three point line. In game 2 of Stjarnan's first round playoff series against Grindavík, Sarajlija suffered a meniscus tear in his right knee, effectively ending his season.

In July 2021, Sarajlija signed with 1. deild karla club Fjölnir.

Club career statistics

Euroleague

|-
| style="text-align:left;"| 2008–09
| style="text-align:left;"| Union Olimpija
| 6 || 0 || 19.7 || .343 || .278 || .769 || 1.7 || 1.2 || 1.5 || .0 || 6.5 ||

References

External links
 Mirza Sarajlija at euroleague.net
 Mirza Sarajlija at abaliga.com
 Mirza Sarajlija at balkanleague.net
 Icelandic statistics at Icelandic Basketball Association

1991 births
Living people
ABA League players
Mirza Sarajlija
KK Mornar Bar players
KK Šentjur players
KK Olimpija players
KK Tamiš players
Point guards
Slovenian men's basketball players
Basketball players from Ljubljana
Mirza Sarajlija
Mirza Sarajlija
KK Jazine Arbanasi players